The Administration of Justice Act 1705 (4 & 5 Anne c 3) was an Act of the Parliament of England.

The whole Act ceased to have effect by virtue of section 34(1) of, and Schedule 2 to, the Administration of Justice Act 1965.

Section 12
This section was repealed by section 1 of, and Schedule 1 to, the Statute Law Revision Act 1948.

Section 13
This section was repealed by section 1 of, and Schedule 1 to, the Statute Law Revision Act 1948.

Section 24
In this section, the words from "from and after" to "Trinity term" and the words "and all the statutes of jeofails" were repealed by section 1 of, and Schedule 1 to, the Statute Law Revision Act 1948.

See also
Administration of Justice Act

References
Halsbury's Statutes,

Acts of the Parliament of England
1705 in law
1705 in England